Jordan Weidner is an American former professional basketball player and current assistant coach for Grace College. He played two seasons in the National Basketball League of Canada (NBL). He played college basketball for Indiana Wesleyan.

College career
Weidner played college basketball at Indiana Wesleyan University and left the program as its all-time leader in assists and scored the third-most points in school history. At Indiana Wesleyan, he was the only player in its history to earn National Association of Intercollegiate Athletics All-American honors on three occasions. In 2014, he led the Wildcats to their first-ever NAIA Division II National Championship victory. and was named the tournament's Chuck Taylor MVP, as well as first team all-American.

Professional career
He was selected by the Power with the first overall pick in the 2014 NBL Canada draft.

On October 1, 2015, Weidner signed with the London Lightning of the NBL Canada. The team would be coached by Kyle Julius, who directed the Power squad during Weidner's rookie season. On January 22, 2016, Weidner was placed on injured reserve with a concussion.

Coaching career
Weidner turned to coaching in 2017, joining the staff at his alma mater as a graduate assistant. In 2019 he was hired as an assistant at Grace College.

References

External links
Jordan Weidner on USBasket.com

Year of birth missing (living people)
Living people
American expatriate basketball people in Canada
American men's basketball coaches
American men's basketball players
Basketball coaches from Indiana
Basketball players from Indiana
Guards (basketball)
Indiana Wesleyan Wildcats men's basketball coaches
Indiana Wesleyan Wildcats men's basketball players
London Lightning players
Mississauga Power players
People from Danville, Indiana